John Mendenhall may refer to:

 John Mendenhall (American football) (1948–2021), American football defensive tackle
 John Mendenhall (colonel) (1829–1892), Union Army officer during the American Civil War
 John C. Mendenhall (1904–1976), American politician from Iowa